FC Zürich Frauen is a women's association football club from Zürich, Switzerland. Its first team plays since the founding of the Swiss national league in 1970 in the first division. The team has won 23 national championships and has won the Cup 15 times.

History 
FC Zürich Frauen was founded on 24 April 1970 as a section of SV Seebach, a football club founded 1916 from the Zurich city quarter of Seebach. 1980 the team won its first championship, one year later the team won the double. Until 2005 it totalled 12 Championships and 7 Cup wins.

That year the women's team of SV Seebach Zürich was spun off from the original club and rebranded under the name FFC Zürich Seebach. Between 2005 und 2008 the 13th championship followed and the 8th win of the Swiss Cup.

In summer 2008, the team was combined with FC Zürich. The name FFC Zürich Seebach was changed into FC Zürich Frauen. The very first Swiss women's football team had been founded on 21  February 1968 under the helm of FC Zürich as DFC Zürich, but later discontinued. In summer 2010, FC Zürich Frauen moved its home for league games and practice from Seebach to the Heerenschürli sport park in the city quarter of Hirzenbach where youth teams of FC Zürich were already based. In 2021, the club opened there a new "Home of FC Zürich" to bring the men's, women's and youth teams under one roof. 

FC Zürich Frauen is Swiss record champion before the women's team of BSC YB Frauen (including titles of FFC Bern and DFC Bern). After 10 years without the championship title the team won it in 2008 and was able to defend it in 2009 and 2010.

In the UEFA competitions, Zürich reached the 2nd qualifying round in the 2008–09 UEFA Women's Cup. In the 2009-10 and 2010–11 UEFA Women's Champions League they reached the round of 32, and lost there to Linköping and Torres. In 2012-2013, the team played 1:1 and 0:1 in the round of 32 against the French top team Juvisy. In the 2013-2014 Champions League competition, FC Zürich was the first Swiss women's team to reach the Champions League round of 16 after playing 2:1 and 1:1 against Sparta Prague in the round of 32. In the following stage, the team lost against FC Barcelona 0:3 and 1:3.

Stadium 
The Heerenschürli sport park also serves as home ground for the women's team of FC Zürich and most of the national league and cup games. The international games were played first at stadium Schützenwiese in Winterthur. Since 2012 these games are hosted at the Letzigrund stadium in Zürich. 

On the 13th of November 2013, 7,304 fans watched the round of 16 second leg game against FC Barcelona, which was a record attendance for Swiss women's football for many years. Servette FC Chênois Féminin broke the record in 2021, when they had 12,782 people at their home game against Chelsea F.C. Women in the newly introduced group stage of the UEFA Women's Champions League. However, when FC Zürich Frauen also qualified for the group stage a year later in 2022, the club's home stadium Letzigrund wasn't available due to scheduling issues. The three matches against Juventus, Lyon and Arsenal then were played at the Wefox Arena Schaffhausen, about 40km away from Zürich. The stadium's capacity of 8,000 then prevented another record attendance from the beginning.

Titles

Official
 Swiss Champion (23):
 as SV Seebach Zürich: 12 (1980, 1981, 1982, 1983, 1985, 1987, 1988, 1990, 1991, 1993, 1994, 1998)
 as FFC Zürich Seebach: 1 (2008)
 as FC Zürich Frauen: 10 (2009, 2010, 2012, 2013, 2014, 2015, 2016, 2018, 2019, 2022)
 Swiss Cup Champion (15):
 as SV Seebach Zürich: 7 (1981, 1986, 1987, 1988, 1989, 1990, 1993)
 as FFC Zürich Seebach: 1 (2007)
 as FC Zürich Frauen: 7 (2012, 2013, 2015, 2016, 2018, 2019, 2022)

Invitational
 Menton Tournament: 1 (1990)

Current squad

Former players

References

External links 
Official Website
Club at UEFA.com 
Website of former parent club SV Seebach

Frauen FC Zurich
Women's football clubs in Switzerland
1970 establishments in Switzerland